Fossé may refer to the following communes in France:

 Fossé, Ardennes, in the Ardennes department
 Fossé, Loir-et-Cher, in the Loir-et-Cher department
 Le Fossé, in the Seine-Maritime department

it:Fosse